Hoganstand.com  is a news website and the online face of the monthly Gaelic games magazine Hogan Stand, which is distributed throughout Ireland. The magazine is named after the main stand in Croke Park, where the trophies are presented to the winning captains. The magazine was founded in 1991. The website also has a poorly designed outdated fan chat forum.

References

External links
 

1991 establishments in Ireland
Gaelic games magazines
Magazines established in 1991
Magazines published in Ireland
Monthly magazines published in Ireland